Zayn al-Dīn Abū Jaʿfar Muḥammad ibn ʿAlī ibn Shahrāshūb ibn Abī Naṣr ibn Abī al-Jaysh, more commonly known simply as Ibn Shahrāshūb, died 1192, was a  literate Shia commentator, traditionist and jurist. He was an early eminent scholar amongst the shia community in the investigation of hadith and also Quranic sciences.

Life
He was born in 1095. His complete name was Abu Jafar Muhammad Ibn Ali Ibn Shahr Ashub. It seems that he originally was from Sari, Iran city of Mazandaran province. Due to lack of prominent sources, his birthplace remains uuncertain. It is well-documented that he memorized the whole Quran.

Scientific journey
Given that Ibn Shahr Ashoub was a traditionist, he traveled to many cities and countries, listening to and collecting Hadith. First he traveled to Baghdad during Al-Muqtafi as Abbasid Caliphate, then to Mosul and after to Aleppo. He also traveled to Khorasan before going to Baghdad. Also, he was for a while in Neishabour, sabzevar and kharazm. Also it is said that he visited some cities such as Isfahan, Ray, Kashan and Hamadan. Apparently when he was in Aleppo, both Ibn Batriq and Ibn Idris had listened to him. Ibn Shahr Asoub migrated and also died in Aleppo.

Teachers
According to pakatchi, Ibn Shahr Asoub had many popular masters in hadith such as follow:
 Ahmad Ghazali
 Ja Allah zamakhshari
 Abu Ali Tabarsi
 Abul Hasan Beihaqi farid Khorasan
 Khatib-e- khawrazm
 Qotb Addin Ravandi

Works
He left many books but some of them have been published. He wrote Manaqib Of Ale Abi Talib in praise of the virtues of Imam Ali. Some sermon also narrated by him for the first time.  The most important books by him could be listed as below:
Manaqib Of Ale Abi Talib
Ma'alim Al Quran
Motashabih al Quran va Mokhtalifih

Theological beliefs
At the same time some other scholars believe that Ibn Shahr Ashoub not only believe in Imam's knowledge to Qhayb but he refers to it by reports from Imam Ali including possessing knowledge of Unseen and prophesy future events such as times of death of various people. On the other hand, some scholars think that he believed that both Imams and prophets couldn't have any knowledge of the Ghayb (absence) and that of past and future. Ibn Shahr Asoub denied these kinds of knowledge for imams and prophets. He believed, if this belief would be correct then we believe in parties for God. Instead he had believed that Imams and prophets just have knowledge of religion and law. he also referred to the point that Fatima has addressed by divine message.

Death
He died in 1192 when he had residence in Aleppo. He was buried near a place by the name of Jabal Al Joshan known as Mashahd al Hosein.

See also
Fiqh Jaffaria
Shia Islam
Hadith studies
Shaykh Tusi

References

Further reading

Iranian Shia scholars of Islam
Iranian scholars
12th-century Persian-language writers
People from Sari, Iran